Marguerite IV d'Haraucourt, (15??–1568), was a German-Roman monarch as Princess Abbess of the Imperial Remiremont Abbey in France. She was abbess twice: a first term 1520–28, and a second in 1544–68.

She was elected in 1520, but was deposed in 1528. In 1544, she became abbess for a second term. During her reign, Remiremont was forced to submit to the sovereignty of the Duchy of Lorraine.

References 
    Worldwide Guide to Women in Leadership. Women in power

Year of birth missing
1568 deaths
Abbesses of Remiremont